Ichiro Yoda (1860 – September 28, 1933) was a Japanese politician who served as the governor of Hiroshima Prefecture from July 1921 to October 1922. Prior to that, he served as the governor of Gunma Prefecture (1912), and of Nagano Prefecture (1913-1914).

Governors of Hiroshima
1860 births
1933 deaths
Japanese Home Ministry government officials
Japanese Police Bureau government officials
19th-century Japanese lawyers
Governors of Gunma Prefecture
Governors of Nagano